Alexandre Bonnet (born 17 October 1986) is a French professional footballer who plays as a midfielder for  club Quevilly-Rouen.

Club career
Bonnet made his professional debut with Toulouse.

In 2009, Bonnet joined Ligue 2 club Le Havre. In June 2022, he announced his departure from the club after thirteen seasons. He made 470 appearances and scored 52 goals for Le Havre, becoming the club’s captain. Bonnet subsequently signed for Quevilly-Rouen, also in Ligue 2.

International career
Between 2006 and 2008, Bonnet made four appearances and scored one goal for the France U21 national team.

Career statistics

References

External links
 
 

1986 births
Living people
People from La Roche-sur-Yon
French footballers
Ligue 1 players
Ligue 2 players
Toulouse FC players
CS Sedan Ardennes players
Le Havre AC players
US Quevilly-Rouen Métropole players
France under-21 international footballers
Association football midfielders
Sportspeople from Vendée
Footballers from Pays de la Loire